Daniel Stanchfield (June 8, 1820 – May 23, 1908) was an American businessman, explorer, and politician.

Stanchfield was born in Leeds, Maine. In 1847, Stanchfield settled in Wisconsin Territory, in the community of Saint Anthony which is now Minneapolis, Minnesota. Stanchfield explored the Rum River in Minnesota Territory. He was involved in the logging business and mercantile business. Stanchfield served in the Minnesota Territorial House of Representatives in 1855. In 1861, he moved to Iowa and then moved back to Minneapolis in 1889. Stanchfield died in Fort Collins, Colorado. Stanchfield Township in Isanti County, Minnesota was named after Stanchfield.

Notes

1820 births
1908 deaths
American explorers
People from Leeds, Maine
Businesspeople from Minneapolis
Members of the Minnesota Territorial Legislature
19th-century American politicians
19th-century American businesspeople